Peter de Regalado (Latin Regalatus) (1390 – 30 March 1456) was a Franciscan (friar minor) and reformer.  

Peter de Regalado was born at Valladolid, Spain. His parents were of noble birth and conspicuous for their wealth and virtue. Having lost his father in his early youth, he was piously educated by his mother. At the age of ten years Peter begged to be admitted into the Conventual Franciscans, which favour was granted him three years later in the convent of his native town. In 1404, he became one of the first disciples of Pedro de Villacreces, who in 1397 had introduced into Spain the reform of the observance.

In the newly founded convent at Aguilera, Peter found a life of solitude, prayer, and poverty. In 1415, he became superior of the convent at Aguilera and, on the death of Pedro de Villacreces (1422), the convent at Tribulos (del Abroyo). He effected many important reforms in the discipline of its Spanish monasteries. Peter observed nine Lents, fasting on bread and water, and was endowed with the gift of miracles and prophecy. In 1442, he was appointed head of all the Spanish Franciscans in his reform group. He was known for his charity to the poor.

After his death on March 31, 1456, his grave became a place of pilgrimage. When his body was exhumed 36 years later, at the insistence of Isabella the Catholic, it was found incorrupt and placed in a more precious tomb.

He was beatified by Pope Innocent XI on 11 March 1684, and canonized by Pope Benedict XIV on 29 June 1746.

His feast is celebrated 13 May, the day of the translation of his body. In art he is represented with flames bursting from his heart.

References

Spanish Roman Catholic saints
Conventual Friars Minor
1390 births
1456 deaths
15th-century Christian saints
Canonizations by Pope Benedict XIV
Beatifications by Pope Innocent XI
Catetory:Franciscan saints